Annette Kate Ekblom (born 1956) is an English actress. She is the mother of actress Amelia Warner.

She starred as Linda in Willy Russell's musical Blood Brothers when Bill Kenwright's production opened in London in 1988. She can also be heard on the 1988 revival cast recording with Kiki Dee. Ekblom played the role of family matriarch Debbie Gordon in the Channel 4 television soap opera Brookside in 32 episodes from 2002 to 2003.

Filmography
Noah’s Castle - TV series (1979)
Shoestring - 1979
God's Wonderful Railway - 1980 BBC children's drama series (Marjorie Grant) 3 episodes
Going Out (TV series) - 1981 Blood Brothers - Musical (Linda) 1988
Coronation Street 1992-1994Cracker - TV series (Diane) 1995The Wild House - BBC TV Sitcom (Mother) 1996
Fever Pitch (Robert's Mother) 1997The Broker's Man - BBC drama series (Sally Griffin) 1997-1998 Peak Practice - ITV drama series (Patricia Davey) 6 episodes 1999Inspector Morse - “The Remorseful Day” S8:E5 (Mrs. Holmes) - 2000Take Me - UK TV mini-series (Lauren) 2001Brookside - Debbie Gordon 32 episodes 2002-2003 Holby City - BBC drama series 7 episodes 2004-2009 Wallander'' - BBC programme series 3 episode "Before The Frost" 2012

References

External links
 

English soap opera actresses
English musical theatre actresses
Living people
1956 births